The Lun-class ekranoplan (also called Project 903) is the only ground effect vehicle (GEV) to ever be operationally deployed as a warship. It was designed by Rostislav Alexeyev in 1975 and used by the Soviet and later Russian navies from 1987 until sometime in the late 1990s.

Although they might look similar to traditional aircraft, ekranoplans like the Lun are not classified as aircraft, seaplanes, hovercraft, or hydrofoils. Rather, craft like the Lun-class ekranoplan are classified as maritime ships by the International Maritime Organization due to their use of the ground effect, in which the craft glides just above the surface of the water.

The ground effect occurs when flying at an altitude of only a few metres above the ocean or ground; drag is greatly reduced by the proximity of the ground preventing the formation of wingtip vortices, thus increasing the efficiency of the wing. This effect does not occur at high altitude.

The name Lun comes from the Russian word for the harrier.

Design and development

The Lun-class ekranoplan was developed on the basis of the experimental KM ekranoplan, which was nicknamed the "Caspian Sea Monster".

The Lun was powered with eight Kuznetsov NK-87 turbofans, mounted on forward canards, each producing  of thrust. It had a flying boat hull with a large deflecting plate at the bottom to provide a "step" for takeoff.

Equipped for anti-surface warfare, it carried the P-270 Moskit (Mosquito) guided missile. Six missile launchers were mounted in pairs on the dorsal surface of its fuselage with advanced tracking systems mounted in its nose and tail.

The only model of this class ever built to completion, the MD-160, entered service with the Soviet Navy Caspian Flotilla in 1987. It was retired in the late 1990s and sat unused at a Caspian Sea naval base in Kaspiysk until 2020.

The second Lun-class ekranoplan was partially built in the late 1980s. While its construction was underway, it was redesigned as a mobile field hospital for rapid deployment to any ocean or coastal location. It was named the Spasatel ("Rescuer"). Following the collapse of the Soviet Union in 1991 and cancellation of military funding, construction of the second craft was halted. As of 2021, the uncompleted Spasatel is stored adjacent to the Volga river in an old industrial complex within the central Russian city of
Nizhny Novgorod.

The Lun design had several drawbacks. Another was that the craft was only designed to use the ground effect principle, so it could not ascend to higher cruising altitudes. The requirement for calm seas to operate and inability to fly above them if they weren't greatly limited where it was able to deploy.

2020 towing operation

On 31 July 2020, the completed MD-160 Lun-class ekranoplan was towed out of the naval base in Kaspiysk, with the intention of being eventually put on public display in Derbent, Dagestan, at the planned Patriot Park, a combination museum and theme park that will display Soviet and Russian military equipment. The towing operation involved the use of rubber pontoons, three tugboats and two escort vessels, and would have covered approximately  had it been completed. However, during the tow the ekranoplan became stuck just offshore of a sandy beach, short of the intended destination.

The team managing the towing operation was unable to free the massive vehicle, so the ekranoplan was secured and remained beached in the surf zone while plans were drawn up on how to continue the move to Patriot Park.  In the meantime, the unusual craft began attracting attention from the media, onlookers, and trespassing "urban explorers", even before the park was built.  One report published in August 2020 stated that the hull, exposed to the waves in the surf zone, was taking on water. Moving the craft to dry land beyond the surf zone would eliminate the possibility that increased wave action during storms could damage the hull further.  

The ekranoplan was towed ashore on 30 December 2021.

Former operators

 Soviet Navy

Specifications

Related development
 Caspian Sea Monster (KM)
 Spasatel
 A-050
 А-300-538

References

External links

   (1m0s)
   (2m5s, silent)
 Satellite view after Lun was successfully pulled ashore via Yandex Maps
 Wired article with  image gallery (suitable for slow or metered connections)
 Extensive Lun imagery (faster connection recommended) with Russian text, or mirrored imagery with translated captions 
 Cutaway provisional drawing of the Lun-class ekranoplan via hisutton.com ekranoplan/WIG page

Ekranoplans
Ground effect vehicles
Alekseyev Central Hydrofoil Design Bureau